Andrea Botero Coy (born ) is a Colombian female  track cyclist, and part of the national team. She competed in the omnium and team pursuit event at the 2009 UCI Track Cycling World Championships.

References

External links
 Profile at cyclingarchives.com

1988 births
Living people
Colombian track cyclists
Colombian female cyclists
Place of birth missing (living people)
20th-century Colombian women
21st-century Colombian women